Dr. Dick Traum is the founder of the Achilles Track Club for disabled athletes. In 1976, he completed the New York City Marathon, becoming the first runner to complete such an event with a prosthetic leg. In the 1980s he became the first amputee to finish a 100 km ultra event, in Poland.

Terry Fox credited reading an article about Traum's marathon running inspired his cross-Canada run for cancer research.

In 2010, Traum was inducted into the National Jewish Sports Hall of Fame. The Achilles Track Club was renamed Achilles International in 2004. Dick remained the CEO for 37-years before retiring in 2019. He was inducted to the NYRR Hall of Fame in 2018.

References

Year of birth missing (living people)
Living people
American male long-distance runners
American amputees
American disabled sportspeople